Lanker may refer to:

Brian Lanker, American photographer
Dustin Lanker, American keyboardist
Lanker See, German lake

Chris Lanker, American Businessman